Juanita Phillips (born 11 October 1963 in Brisbane) is an Australian journalist and news presenter. Phillips is currently weeknight presenter of ABC News NSW in Sydney.

Career
Phillips began her career in Brisbane in 1982 as a cadet journalist at The Courier-Mail where she became a feature writer and columnist.

In the early 1990s, Phillips worked at TVQ-10 Brisbane as a reporter and presenter and she made her national debut as regular presenter on Ten Eyewitness News weekend late edition (from Network Ten's Brisbane studios) in 1993. A year later, Phillips moved to Sydney to join Ron Wilson on TEN-10's Ten News First at Five, succeeding Sandra Sully and she was lead female presenter for the bulletin for two years and was later succeeded by Jessica Rowe.

In 1997, following a stint as presenter with Sky News Australia, Phillips moved to London where she worked as a news presenter at BBC World News while at the same time running a London café. She later moved to CNN International, also in London, working mainly as co-anchor on CNN Today before returning to Australia as weekend presenter of ABC News in New South Wales.

In 2003, she moved to co-anchor ABC News NSW with Tony Eastley and later become solo presenter of the bulletin.

During 2007, Phillips wrote a number of articles for The Bulletin including an article on animal rights activist Lyn White that caused some controversy.

On 30 November 2007, Phillips suffered an on-air coughing fit while presenting ABC News NSW, forcing the ABC to switch to a simulcast of the Victoria state bulletin from its Melbourne station until her coughing fit subsided. In her 2010 book, A Pressure Cooker Saved My Life, she describes the episode as a result of a stress-induced laryngeal spasm.

On 19 November 2013, The Australian published the ABC's top salaries; Phillips' salary is $316,000.

Personal life
In 2002, Phillips married Mario Milostic, an Australian graphic designer, after a six-week courtship. Their first child was born in 2003 and their daughter in 2006. In 2009, Phillips took carer's leave from the ABC to care for their children while her husband Mario was interstate for rehabilitation from bowel cancer. They separated in 2010.

In 2012, Phillips began a relationship with Federal Government Minister for Climate Change, Greg Combet. In 2013, the relationship attracted some controversy for a first-class overseas trip paid from government funds. In May 2013, Phillips was removed from one evening's ABC News bulletin due to a conflict of interest that arose after Combet faced an ICAC inquiry into government corruption.

Publications
The Newspaper Kids, series of five children's books, 1996, 1997, HarperCollins
A Pressure Cooker Saved My Life: how to have it all, do it all, and keep it all together, 2010, ABC Books,

References

ABC News (Australia) presenters
10 News First presenters
1963 births
Living people
Journalists from Queensland
Writers from Brisbane
Australian children's writers
Australian autobiographers